Ban Krang is a subdistrict in the Mueang Phitsanulok District of Phitsanulok Province, Thailand.

Geography
Ban Krang is bordered to the north by Phai Kho Don and Tha Chang, to the east by Chom Thong, to the south by Tha Thong and to the west by Bang Rakam of Bang Rakam District.  Ban Krang lies in the Nan Basin, which is part of the Chao Phraya Watershed.

Administration
The following is a list of the subdistrict's muban, which roughly correspond to villages:

Temples
วัดนิมิตรธรรมาราม in Ban Wang Pa Yai
วัดพระขาวชัยสิทธิ์ in muban 3
วัดเกาะแหลมโพธิ์ in muban 9
วัดธรรมเกษร in muban 7
วัดแม่ระหัน in muban 10
วัดเด่นโบสถ์โพธิ์งาม in muban 1
วัดพระยายมราช in muban 9
วัดใหม่เกาะกลางตลุง in muban 10
วัดป่าเลไลยก์ in muban 10

Attractions
Bueng Mae Rahan (a large natural swamp)

References

Tambon of Phitsanulok province
Populated places in Phitsanulok province